St. Charles School District may refer to:

 St. Charles Community Schools, St. Charles, Michigan
 St. Charles Community Unit School District 303, near Chicago, Illinois
 St. Charles Parish Public School System, Luling, Louisiana
 St. Charles Public Schools, St. Charles, Minnesota
 City of St. Charles School District, St, Charles, Missouri